Naval Base Majuro was a major United States Navy base built on Majuro Atoll, in the Marshall Islands to support the World War II efforts in the Pacific War. The base was built after the Battle of Majuro-Kwajalein ended 3 February 1944. Majuro was found to be unoccupied and abandoned when the United States Army arrived. The US Navy built airfields, seaport, and other facilities on the captured islands. The base was part of the vast Naval Base Marshall Islands.

History
When the US Army arrived they found abandoned a Darrit Island 400-foot timber pier, a seaplane ramp, Dalop Island 5,800-foot runway, and warehouses. US Navy Seabees of the 100th Construction Battalion began improvement projects at the base. On the Delap the 800 feet (1,800 m) by 445 feet (136 m) runway was repaired and paved in coral. The complete Majuro Airfield became home to a number of units: two Marine dive-bomber squadrons, half a Marine patrol squadron, and staging a United States Army Air Forces fighter group. The Naval used the Airfield for its Naval Air Transport Service and patrols. The Majuro Atoll offered excellent fleet anchorage in the large protected lagoon. The lagoon has depths of 150 to 210-feet, with only a few coral heads. The lagoon islands had some sand beaches used for boats, landing craft and Landing Ship, Tank. On Calanin Island, at the entrance to the lagoon Seabees built a signal station and a harbor entrance control station.

Seabee built and manned at Acorn 8 Naval dispensary. Seabee used both new construction Quonset huts and captured buildings in their projects. Seabee built a 150-bed hospital. For the airfield, Seabees built a 12,000-barrel fuel depot for aviation gasoline storage on Bigariat Island and 4-inch pipe system to bring it to the airfield. For freshwater Seabees installed a Water distillation plant. The 21 distillation stills turned seawater into 50,000 gallons of fresh water per day. The water was stored in a system of tanks and plumbing with a total of 180,000 gallons for all the islands in the base. Water tank trucks were used for long runs. The one captured pier was not able to keep up with the demands of the growing base, Seabees installed a deep-water 25 by 28 foot pontoon floating pier. Seabees used coral to pave 10 miles of road and the top of 11,000 feet of causeways, making Delap-Uliga-Djarrit. The causeways were built to connect the many small base islands together. A large Seabee camp, repair shops, and supply depot was built. For the troop barracks, mess halls, bomb-proof shelters, and recreation facilities were constructed by the Seabees. As the airfield took up almost all of Dalop Island, Uliga Island, Laura Island Rairok Island and other islands of the tropical Majuro Atoll were used. Majuro Atoll has 56 islands.  In February 1944 the 100th Battalion was relieved with the arrival of Construction Battalion Detachment 1034. On 18 June 1944 the 60th Seabee Battalion was relieved with the arrival of Construction Battalion Maintenance Unit (CBMU) 591. Unlike most Pacific Navy bases, Naval Base Majuro was moved to a more forward location as the fighting moved towards Japan's homeland. On V-J Day, surrender of Japan on 2 September 1945 the base was still in full operation.

Majuro Submarine Base
The demand for submarine bases during World War 2 was so great that bases were built around special ships called submarine tenders. Submarine Tenders carried fuel for the submarines, food for the crew, and living quarters for the crew to rest while the sub was being serviced. The Tender's depot had all the supplies that the submarine needed to get back on patrol. Submarine base had limited land facilities such Naval Base Majuro operated as an advanced submarine base. Sub-crews enjoyed the 750-man submarine base camp and fleet recreation center at the base. Majuro Submarine Base was supported by the submarine tenders: USS Howard W. Gilmore (AS-16), USS Bushnell (AS-15), USS Argonne (AS-10), and USS Sperry (AS-12).

Majuro Destroyer Base
To keep US Navy destroyer in the war and not at faraway bases, Majuro became a Destroyer  Base. US Navy destroyer tenders provided food, fuel, and ammo to the destroyer. Minor repair work was also done at the base. The crew was able to enjoy the fleet recreation center at the base during this time. The base was made with stationed destroyer tenders: USS Prairie (AD-15) and USS Markab

Airfields
US Navy Seabees built two airfields at Naval Base Majuro :
Majuro Airfield, called Naval Air Facility Majuro 
Uliga Airfield on Uliga Island

A number of bombers and fighter squadrons operated from the airfields. For aircraft navigation, a loran transmitting station was built. 

The Naval stations at the Marshall Islands had stationed:
 Vought F4U Corsair
 Grumman F6F Hellcat with VF-39 
 Douglas TBD Devastator
 Grumman TBF Avenger
 Curtiss XBTC for Scouting bombing (VSB)
 Utility-Transport (VJR) planes, like the  Douglas R4D and Douglas R5D

At Majuro Airfield the Navy supported the installment of the 4th Marine Aircraft Wing and the Marine Aircraft Group 13 in March 1944. The Seabees constructed two 750-man camps, shops and storage facilities for the United States Marine Corps. 

The Navy decided to place a pool of fighter planes ready to replace losses on Aircraft carrier at Naval Base Majuro. As Majuro Airfield did not have the space for the new air base, Seabees built a new 4,000 foot by 175-foor runway on Uliga Island.  Uliga Island was connected to Dalop by the built two-lane causeway. Two Carrier Aircraft Service Units were based as the airfields to support the many Navy planes at the base.

Post war
Marshall Islands War Memorial Park on Delap

Gallery

See also
List of islands of the Marshall Islands
US Naval Advance Bases
World War II United States Merchant Navy

External links
youtube.com Airport to Uliga Majuro Atoll Marshall Island
youtube.com  Majuro Atoll Marshall Island
youtube.com  Task Force At  Majuro Atoll Marshall Island

References

Naval Stations of the United States Navy
Closed installations of the United States Navy
1944 establishments in Oceania
Military installations established in 1944
Naval Base Majuro